The Snowdome is an indoor ski slope just off the A5 road in Tamworth, Staffordshire, England. It opened in May 1994 and was the first full-sized recreational indoor ski slope in the UK.

Facilities
There are also 2 serial 'travelator' lifts for access back to the top and two rope-tows.

The Snowdome has a learner slope underneath the main slope. The main slope also holds regular 'ramp nights' in which several objects are added, including a gas pipe, mini rail and a quarter pipe.

There is also one ice rink and one ice track - the UK’s only - which circles the real Snow Fun Park and the ice rink with a number of other things.

The complex also contains a  swimming pool and gym—formerly known as Peaks Leisure Centre, but now owned and managed by the Snowdome as 'Snowdome Swim' and 'Snowdome Fitness' respectively. There is also a bar (aspens), a shop Ellis Brigham, and a Starbucks coffee shop on site.

Events

Construction work started in early 2009 for Sawley Cross properties to build a 120-bed, £7M hotel on land adjacent to the snowdome. The Holiday Inn Hotel opened in late November 2009.

Incidents 
On 24 September 2021, a twelve-year-old boy was killed after being injured at a tobogganing party at the snowdome.

References

External links
 

Skiing in the United Kingdom
Skiing in England
Indoor ski resorts
Ski areas and resorts in England
Tourist attractions in Staffordshire
Buildings and structures in Tamworth, Staffordshire